Tintin on the Moon is a 1987 video game loosely based on the Destination Moon and Explorers on the Moon comic books from The Adventures of Tintin, the series by Belgian cartoonist Hergé. It is a first person shoot 'em up/side scroller and the first Tintin video game.

Summary
This video game was originally made by Infogrames for various home platforms in 1987 and was converted to DOS by Probe Entertainment in 1989. The game's storyline is based loosely on the plot of the Destination Moon and Explorers on the Moon comics from the series. The object of the game is to land on the Moon, while avoiding asteroids and thwarting enemies within the rocket.

Tintin on the Moon was the first PC game to feature the character Tintin.

External links

Tintin on the Moon at the Internet Archive

Amiga games
Amstrad CPC games
Atari ST games
Commodore 64 games
DOS games
ZX Spectrum games
1987 video games
Infogrames games
Video games based on Tintin
Video games scored by Jeroen Tel
Video games developed in France
Video games set on the Moon
Single-player video games